James Edward Haynes (born 29 September 1972) is an English former first-class cricketer.

Haynes was born at Nottingham. He later studied at Linacre College at the University of Oxford. While studying at Oxford, he played first-class cricket for Oxford University in 1997, making two appearances against Durham and Hampshire, with Haynes scoring 13 runs.

References

External links

1972 births
Living people
Cricketers from Nottingham
Alumni of Linacre College, Oxford
English cricketers
Oxford University cricketers